Chough is a Korean surname. Notable people with the surname include:

Keumhee Carrière Chough, Korean-Canadian statistician
Chough Pyung-ok (1894–1960), South Korean politician

Korean-language surnames